Mal-e Khalifeh (also Romanized as Māl-e Khalīfeh, Māl-i-Khelifeh, and Mal Khalifeh; also known as Khalīfeh) is a village in Hayat Davud Rural District, in the Central District of Ganaveh County, Bushehr Province, Iran. At the 2006 census, its population was 889, in 196 families.

References 

Populated places in Ganaveh County